Soisy-sur-Seine (literally Soisy on Seine) is a commune in the Essonne department in Île-de-France in northern France.

Population
Inhabitants of Soisy-sur-Seine are known as Soiséens in French.

See also
Communes of the Essonne department

References

External links

Official website 
Mayors of Essonne Association 

Communes of Essonne